John Mustard was an English professional association footballer who played as a winger. During his 12-year career, he played for eight different clubs in the Football League.

References

People from The Boldons
Footballers from Tyne and Wear
English footballers
Association football midfielders
Queens Park Rangers F.C. players
South Shields F.C. (1889) players
Wrexham A.F.C. players
Preston North End F.C. players
Burnley F.C. players
Southend United F.C. players
Crewe Alexandra F.C. players
New Brighton A.F.C. players
English Football League players
Year of birth missing
Year of death missing